Miez may refer to:

 Georges Miez (1904–1999), Swiss gymnast
 Miez, former name of Mies, Switzerland
 Piz Miez, mountain of the Oberhalbstein Alps, located on the border between Italy and Switzerland